128th meridian may refer to:

128th meridian east, a line of longitude east of the Greenwich Meridian
128th meridian west, a line of longitude west of the Greenwich Meridian